Noura Hussein Hammad is a Sudanese woman who was sentenced to death by hanging on 10 May 2018 for killing her husband after he raped her. Hussein's legal team was given two weeks to appeal the sentence. In June 2018, Sudan commuted her sentence to five years in prison and a restitution payment of 337,000 Sudanese pounds (US $18,700).

She was forced into marriage at age 16; the marriage was arranged when she was 15. The defendant claimed the rape occurred while she was restrained by her husband's family members immediately after her marriage. The husband's family declined opportunities to pardon Hussein or accept financial compensation in lieu of her execution. The case caused worldwide outrage.

Protests against her sentence 
More than a million people, as of 24 May 2018, signed a petition "Justice for Noura" against her execution. Amnesty International issued a statement, according to which Noura is a victim and the sentence "an intolerable act of cruelty". The death penalty highlights the failure of the Sudanese authorities to tackle child marriage, forced marriage and marital rape, AI said. The Office of the United Nations High Commissioner for Human Rights, UN Women, the United Nations Population Fund and the UN Office of the Special Adviser on Africa have all called for clemency while Secretary-General of the United Nations António Guterres voiced his opposition to the sentence through a spokesman. More recently, the court in Sudan overturned Noura's death sentence, instead subjecting her to a 5 year prison sentence and a fine.

In Literature:
This issue was written about by Emtithal Mahmoud in her chapter 'Sharia state (of mind)' in the book 'Feminists don't wear pink and other lies' by Scarlett Curtis. She described in a poem that what Hussein did was "an act of bravery of self-defence of desperation".

References

Sudanese women
Living people
Year of birth missing (living people)
Women sentenced to death
Forced marriage
Marital rape
Violence against women in Sudan
Victims of human rights abuses
Human rights abuses in Sudan
Sudanese prisoners sentenced to death
Women's rights in Sudan